Dyszno  is a village in the administrative district of Gmina Dębno, within Myślibórz County, West Pomeranian Voivodeship, in north-western Poland. 

The village has a population of 213.

References

Dyszno